Schizophreniac: The Whore Mangler is 1997 exploitation film written, directed and produced by Ron Atkins. It was followed by two sequels, Necromaniac: Schizophreniac 2 in 2003 and The Cuckoo Clocks of Hell in 2011, the latter being a crossover with Last House on Dead End Street.

Plot
The film follows Harry Russo, a psychotic, drug-addicted crossdresser and film writer who is obsessed with a puppet named Rubberneck, the mascot of his favorite film which his girlfriend, Drew, had given him. Harry believes Rubberneck speaks to him, instructing him to commit acts of violence, such as killing "whores" (or "who-ers" as Harry pronounces it). Egged on by Rubberneck, Harry fatally chokes two prostitutes (mutilating and having anal sex with their bodies afterward) and stabs his psychiatrist to death.

As his mind deteriorates, Harry confesses to Rubberneck that his parents neglected, beat, humiliated and raped him throughout his childhood, and that he murdered his father when he tried to leave him and his mother. Harry kills Drew during an argument about his impotence, rapes her body, and eats one of her breasts. While experiencing another psychotic episode, Harry assaults a fence, and castrates and shoots his partner-in-crime. By this point, the authorities realize a serial killer is running amok.

At a pornographic theatre, Harry's obnoxious behavior annoys the other patrons, who he butchers via bludgeoning, slashing and shooting. Seeing a newscast identify him as the serial killer, Harry unsuccessfully tries to dispose of Rubberneck, and has a complete mental breakdown. After suffering a series of nightmares and hallucinations, Harry strangles a neighboring little girl, changes his appearance, and goes on the run with Rubberneck.

Cast
 John Giancaspro as Harry Russo
 Jasmin Putnam as Drew/The Prostitute
 J. Breck Brown as Doctor Brown
 Pete Coleman as Otis
 Garvin Lee as Jack
 Mary Francis as Woman with Baby
 Kevin O'Malley as Jim Rhoades
 Jennifer Atkins as Kim Jenkel
 Bobby Jo Rabishaw as Ms. Parker
 Sandy Shoning as Theater Victim
 Kimberly Lynn Lillard as Child
 Robert Williams as Frank Burget
 Laurie Farwell as Shower Victim
 Michael Anthony Caschetta as Theater Victim 2
 Alexis Giancaspro as Baby in Bathroom
 Gary Lee Bauman as Theater Victim 3
 Ron Atkins as The Radio Man/Rubberneck's Voice

Reception
Critical Condition's review of Schizophreniac and its first sequel described both films as "the definition of sick" and "a love it or hate it affair". A score of three and a half was given by Crypt of the Dead, which wrote that the film is "sick and twisted" and "was a weird and very interesting ride" that despite the bad acting and poor special effects "[has] got some real shock value and it's also quite funny at times".

Horror News.net described it as "not so bad" and "entertaining on several levels", while Film Threat awarded five stars, and summed Schizophreniac up with "There's a sense of danger here and it's bound to leave one's mouth agape despite the shortcomings of an underground film such as poor production value and acting. You don't think to poke fun at bad special effects, sets or performances. You're just waiting to see what the hell will happen next."

Rogue Cinema praised John Giancaspro's erratic performance, and said Schizophreniac may be the most disturbing film they have ever seen. Giancaspro's performance was also commended by Soiled Sinema, whose review gave the closing statement, "As can be expected, most low budget films are complete shit. Ron Atkin's Schizophreniac is an exception to the afflicted world of extremely low budget filmmaking. When you have a star like John Ginacaspro and a director with an eye for entertainment like Ron Atkins, it is hard to go wrong."

On its page detailing the works of Ron Atkins, the Worldwide Celluloid Massacre categorized the film as worthless, and described Giancaspro as "an energetic but bad actor". Unrated Magazine said that while the gore was disappointing and the camera effects could get annoying, the film succeeds at shocking, Giancaspro was great, and that all in all it is "guaranteed a few laughs".

References

External links
 
 

Necrophilia in film
Films about drugs
1990s exploitation films
1990s serial killer films
Films about cannibalism
Films set in the Las Vegas Valley
Films shot in the Las Vegas Valley
1997 LGBT-related films
1997 films
Films about prostitution in the United States
Films about screenwriters
1997 direct-to-video films
Fictional portrayals of schizophrenia
1990s English-language films
American LGBT-related films
American exploitation films
American comedy horror films
1990s American films